Chaturale(Nepali:चतुराले)  is a village in the Nuwakot District of Nepal. The Chaturale village lies in between two rivers, Dhade Khola and Sindure Khola. Chaturale is now located in Kakani Rural Municipality ward no 7. Chaturale is named after its founder, Chatur Bhuj Ale.
The biggest occasion is mainly celebrated in Chaturale bazar.

Population
At the time of the 2011 Nepal census it had a population of 10000 living in 1200 individual households. The population of chaturale is decreasing day by day due the migration of people to Kathmandu and foreign country due to the lack of job opportunity in village.

Facilities 
It has one secondary school called Mahendra Higher secondary school which is located at Dumrechaur, Chaturale and a primary school called Shree Barmayani primary school at Barbandi.

The government is planning to link Ranipauwa to Bidur via chaturale with a better road.

References

External links
UN map of the municipalities of Nuwakot District

Populated places in Nuwakot District